Kyrian Nwoko (born 4 July 1997) is a Maltese professional footballer who plays as a winger and forward for Saint Lucia, on loan from Floriana. He has previously played for Maltese clubs St. Andrews & Valletta, as well as Irish club St Patrick's Athletic and the Malta national team.

Personal life
He is the son of former Malta international footballer Chucks Nwoko.

Club career 
In July 2014, Nwoko was linked with a possible transfer to English clubs Huddersfield Town and Crystal Palace. He moved from St. Andrews to Valletta in June 2017. In July 2021, he was linked with a move to NIFL Premiership side Linfield. Following a transfer fee being agreed between the two clubs, the transfer was held up due to issues obtaining a work permit under new Brexit regulations. On 27 July 2021, Valletta announced that they had agreed a deal with League of Ireland Premier Division club St Patrick's Athletic for Nwoko to move on a 6-month loan deal with the option to make the transfer permanent. The transfer was completed on 28 July 2021, with Nwoko becoming the second striker to sign for the club on that day, after Reading's Nahum Melvin-Lambert. Nwoko made his debut for the club on the 30th July 2021, coming off the bench in the 87th minute of the Dublin derby away to Shamrock Rovers at Tallaght Stadium. On 28 November 2021 Nwoko was an unused substitute in the 2021 FAI Cup Final, as his side defeated rivals Bohemians 4–3 on penalties following a 1–1 draw after extra time in front of a record FAI Cup Final crowd of 37,126 at the Aviva Stadium.
On 31 August 2022, Nwoko returned to football after 9 months out of the game, returning to Malta and signing for Floriana. On 27 January 2023, he signed for Saint Lucia on loan until the end of the season.

International career 
He made two appearances for Malta at the 2014 UEFA European Under-17 Championship. He made his senior national team debut in November 2017 in the 0–3 defeat against Estonia. On 23 March 2019, Nwoko scored his first goal in a 2–1 win over Faroe Islands, as Malta won their first competitive home match in 13 years. In January 2022, Nwoko accused the Malta national team selectors of 'unfair' treatment over allegedly not being selected for the team due to his refusal to take a COVID-19 vaccine when the squad were asked to take a Johnson & Johnson vaccine in May 2021 ahead of their departure to a training camp in Austria. In November 2022, Nwoko returned to the national team, accepting his call up for the friendly games against Greece and the Republic of Ireland.

Career statistics

Club

International

International goals 
Scores and results list Malta's goal tally first.

Honours 
Valletta
Maltese Premier League: 2017–18, 2018–19
Maltese FA Trophy: 2017–18
Maltese Super Cup: 2018, 2019

St Patrick's Athletic
 FAI Cup: 2021

References

External links 
 Profile on Valletta FC

1997 births
Living people
Maltese footballers
Maltese people of Nigerian descent
St. Andrews F.C. players
Valletta F.C. players
St Patrick's Athletic F.C. players
Maltese Premier League players
Association football wingers
Association football forwards
Malta youth international footballers
Malta international footballers
Maltese expatriate footballers
Maltese expatriates in Ireland
Expatriate association footballers in the Republic of Ireland
League of Ireland players
Floriana F.C. players
St. Lucia F.C. players